The women's double trap competition at the 2000 Summer Olympics was the second of three instances, and the only one not won by Kim Rhode, who came third. Pia Hansen raised Rhode's Olympic record by seven hits, and was only one hit from Deborah Gelisio's World records in both the qualification and final rounds. Gelisio won the silver medal, distanced by a four-hit margin.

Records
Prior to this competition, the existing World and Olympic records were as follows.

Qualification round
The qualification round consisted of 20 doubles each in the A, B and C programmes.

OR Olympic record – Q Qualified for final

Final
The final repeated the C programme for the top six shooters.

OR Olympic record

References

Sources

Shooting at the 2000 Summer Olympics
Olymp
Women's events at the 2000 Summer Olympics